The Theraphosoidea are a superfamily of mygalomorph spiders. They contain two families of spiders:
 Theraphosidae, the true tarantulas
 Paratropididae, the bald-legged spiders.

References

Mygalomorphae
Arachnid superfamilies